Planet Patrol is a NASA citizen science project available in Zooniverse and aimed at discovering new exoplanets with data from the TESS telescope.

The project is built on results produced by a computer algorithm. The algorithm measures the center-of-light of the images and automatically compares it to the catalog position of the corresponding star.

The main difference with Planet Hunters is that Planet Patrol looks at objects that represent a detected planet candidate in TESS data, whereas Planet Hunters searches through all the stars in the TESS databases and asks humans to find such candidates.

As of September 2020, there are 1370 volunteers and 72,938 classifications have been done.

The images representing a possible exoplanet transit show a single bright source near the middle of the image with a dot at the center.

See also 
Planet Hunters
Exoplanet Explorers

References 

astronomy